Tulaby Lake is a lake in Becker and Mahnomen counties, in the U.S. state of Minnesota.

Tulaby Lake was named for the freshwater fish Coregonus artedi, commonly known as the tullibee.

See also
List of lakes in Minnesota

References

Lakes of Minnesota
Lakes of Becker County, Minnesota
Lakes of Mahnomen County, Minnesota